Adrià Delgado Baches (born 7 April 1990) is a Spanish Brazilian water polo player. He was part of the Brazilian team at the 2016 Summer Olympics, where the team was eliminated in the quarterfinals.

References

External links
 

1990 births
Living people
Water polo players from Barcelona
Spanish male water polo players
Spanish people of Brazilian descent
Sportspeople of Brazilian descent
People with acquired Brazilian citizenship
Brazilian male water polo players
Water polo players at the 2015 Pan American Games
Medalists at the 2015 Pan American Games
Pan American Games medalists in water polo
Pan American Games silver medalists for Brazil
Olympic water polo players of Brazil
Water polo players at the 2016 Summer Olympics
Brazilian people of Spanish descent